The Silver Fleet is a 1943 British war film written and directed by Vernon Sewell and Gordon Wellesley and produced by Powell and Pressburger under the banner of "The Archers".

Plot
Early during the Second World War, the Nazis overrun the Netherlands and take a submarine shipyard where Jaap van Leyden is chief engineer. The German Gestapo "Protector" Von Schiffer asks van Leyden to cooperate with the new regime. While pondering his decision, van Leyden walks by a school and overhears a teacher telling her class of pupils about Piet Hein, a hero of Dutch lore who captured the Spanish silver fleet and inspired his compatriots to continue fighting for freedom. Van Leyden then decides to accede to Von Schiffer's request. In doing so, he undertakes a covert campaign of sabotage against the German Occupation, leaving notes and graffiti signed under his nom de guerre, "Piet Hein". Thus, van Leyden discretely enables 12 Dutch engineers to hijack a submarine during its trial run and sail it to England, along with its captured Nazi crew.

Later, after construction of a second submarine is completed, Van Leyden plants a bomb inside the sub's engine room, timed to go off the next morning. He then returns home to host a dinner party where he persuades several high-ranking German officials to accompany him on the submarine's maiden (and fatal) sea trial. However, his plans almost go awry when Dutch resistance fighter, Bastiaan Peters, sneaks into Van Leyden's house undetected and threatens to shoot him. But Van Leyden convinces Peters that he is the patriot secretly operating under the persona of "Piet Hein". Peters then diverts any suspicion from van Leyden by fatally shooting himself. The next morning, the submarine is disabled during its underwater trial when the planted bomb explodes and floods the engine room, dooming all on board, including van Leyden.

Cast
In order of appearance, as per ending credits

 Ralph Richardson as Jaap Van Leyden
 Googie Withers as Helene Van Leyden
 Esmond Knight as von Schiffer
 Beresford Egan as Krampf
 Frederick Burtwell as Captain Muller
 Kathleen Byron as Schoolmistress
 Willem Akkerman as Willem Van Leyden
 Dorothy Gordon as Janni Peters
 Charles Victor as Bastiaan Peters
 Joss Ambler as Cornelis Smit
 Margaret Emden as Bertha 
 George Schelderup as Dirk
 Neville Mapp as Joop
 Ivor Barnard as Admiral
 John Carol as Johann
 Lieut. Schouwenaar, R.N.N. as Captain of the U-boat
 Lieut. van Dapperen, R.N.N. as Lieutenant of the U-boat
 John Arold as Navigator of the U-boat
 Philip Leaver as Chief of Police
 Laurence O'Madden as Captain Schneider
 Anthony Eustrel as Lieutenant Wernicke
 Charles Minor as Bohme 
 Valentine Dyall as Markgraf

Production
Some scenes were filmed in the town of King's Lynn.

External links
 
  Full synopsis and film stills (and clips viewable from UK libraries).
 Reviews and articles at the Powell & Pressburger Pages

1943 films
British black-and-white films
British war films
Films by Powell and Pressburger
Films directed by Vernon Sewell
Films set in the Netherlands
Netherlands in fiction
World War II films made in wartime
World War II submarine films
1943 war films
1940s English-language films
1940s British films